Abdoul Fatah Njankou Nsangou (born 27 May 1984), also known as Mustafá, is a Cameroonian former professional footballer who played as a centre-back.

Career
Born in Foumbot, Njankou plays as a defensive midfielder and central defender. He played for Plaza Colonia, Central Español and Nacional in the Primera División Uruguaya.

Njankou joined Indios de Ciudad Juárez before the start of the Primera División de México Clausura 2009 tournament, but was not registered for the season because a medical test revealed he had hypertension.

See also
Football in Cameroon
List of football clubs in Cameroon

References

External links
 
 

1984 births
Living people
Cameroonian footballers
Association football central defenders
Uruguayan Primera División players
Sable FC players
Club Plaza Colonia de Deportes players
Central Español players
Club Nacional de Football players
Indios de Ciudad Juárez footballers
C.A. Bella Vista players
Cameroonian expatriate footballers
Cameroonian expatriate sportspeople in Mexico
Expatriate footballers in Mexico
Cameroonian expatriate sportspeople in Uruguay
Expatriate footballers in Uruguay